Khemraj Naiko (born 23 August 1972) is a retired Mauritian high jumper.

His personal best jump is 2.28 metres, achieved at the 1998 Commonwealth Games in Kuala Lumpur. This is the Mauritian record.

International competitions

References

External links
 

1972 births
Living people
Mauritian people of Indian descent
Mauritian high jumpers
Male high jumpers
Mauritian male athletes
Olympic athletes of Mauritius
Athletes (track and field) at the 1992 Summer Olympics
Athletes (track and field) at the 1996 Summer Olympics
Commonwealth Games competitors for Mauritius
Athletes (track and field) at the 1994 Commonwealth Games
Athletes (track and field) at the 1998 Commonwealth Games
World Athletics Championships athletes for Mauritius
African Games silver medalists for Mauritius
African Games medalists in athletics (track and field)
Athletes (track and field) at the 1995 All-Africa Games
Athletes (track and field) at the 1999 All-Africa Games
Athletes (track and field) at the 2003 All-Africa Games